Melin is a surname.

Geographical distribution
As of 2014, 28.6% of all known bearers of the surname Melin were residents of Sweden (frequency 1:1,616), 25.5% of France (1:12,255), 13.2% of the United States (1:127,967), 7.1% of Chile (1:11,721), 3.7% of Argentina (1:54,659), 3.2% of Brazil (1:297,689), 2.4% of Belgium (1:22,767), 2.1% of Denmark (1:12,351), 1.9% of Mexico (1:309,524), 1.6% of Canada (1:105,438), 1.5% of Russia (1:446,722) and 1.2% of Indonesia (1:516,597).

In Sweden, the frequency of the surname was higher than national average (1:1,616) in the following counties:
 1. Gotland County (1:696)
 2. Västernorrland County (1:760)
 3. Gävleborg County (1:889)
 4. Uppsala County (1:945)
 5. Jönköping County (1:988)
 6. Dalarna County (1:1,102)
 7. Örebro County (1:1,262)
 8. Värmland County (1:1,380)
 9. Blekinge County (1:1,387)

In Chile, the frequency of the surname was higher than national average (1:11,721) in the following regions:
 1. Araucanía Region (1:1,525)
 2. Santiago (1:11,168)

In France, the frequency of the surname was higher than national average (1:12,255) in the following regions:
 1. Saint Pierre and Miquelon (1:1,280)
 2. Hauts-de-France (1:6,609)
 3. Bourgogne-Franche-Comté (1:7,535)
 4. Grand Est (1:8,016)
 5. Nouvelle-Aquitaine (1:8,799)
 6. Centre-Val de Loire (1:10,136)
 7. Auvergne-Rhône-Alpes (1:11,307)

In Denmark, the frequency of the surname was higher than national average (1:12,351) in the following regions:
 1. Central Denmark Region (1:7,146)
 2. Region Zealand (1:11,765)

In Belgium, the frequency of the surname was higher than national average (1:22,767) only in one region: Wallonia (1:8,091).

People
Berith Melin (1918–1977), All-American Girls Professional Baseball League player
Björn Melin (born 1981), Swedish professional ice hockey player
Domingo Melín (dead 1880), Mapuche chief
Douglas Melin (1895–1946), Swedish zoologist and Olympic athlete
Mertil Melin (born 1945), Swedish Army General
Olof Melin (1861–1940),  Swedish colonel and the creator of Melin Shorthand
Roger Melin (born 1956), Swedish ice hockey player and head coach
Sten Melin (born 1957), Swedish composer
Ulrika Melin (1767–1834), Swedish textile artist

References